Kathleen "Katie" Monahan (born November 9, 1972, in Aspen, Colorado) is an American former alpine skier who competed in the 1998 Winter Olympics and 2002 Winter Olympics. In 1992 she made her debut in the FIS World Cup, where she competed in Downhills and Super-Gs. Though her last World Cup appearance was in December 2002, she didn't retire from skiing until 2004.

References

1972 births
Living people
American female alpine skiers
Olympic alpine skiers of the United States
Alpine skiers at the 1998 Winter Olympics
Alpine skiers at the 2002 Winter Olympics
21st-century American women